Melih is a given name. Notable people with the name include:

 Melih Abdulhayoğlu (born 1968), Turkish-American entrepreneur
 Melih Mahmutoğlu, Turkish basketball player
Melih Cevdet Anday (1915–2002), Turkish poet and writer
 Melih Esenbel (1915–1995), Turkish diplomat and Minister of Foreign Affairs
Melih Gökçek (born 1948), Turkish politician and a former MP
Melih Kibar (1951–2005), Turkish composer
Vahit Melih Halefoğlu (born 1919), Turkish politician and diplomat

Turkish masculine given names